Ruth Ben-Ghiat is an American historian and cultural critic. She is a scholar on fascism and authoritarian leaders. Ben-Ghiat is professor of history and Italian studies at New York University.

Biography 
Born in the United States to an Israeli-born Sephardi father and a Scottish mother, she grew up in Pacific Palisades, California. She graduated in history at UCLA and obtained a PhD in comparative history at Brandeis University. A member of the American Historical Association since 1990, she is professor of history and Italian studies at New York University. She regularly writes for CNN, The Atlantic and The Huffington Post.

Works

References

External links 
 
 Ruth Ben Ghiat, Arts & Science faculty @ New York University
 

1960 births
Historians of fascism
American women historians
American people of Israeli descent
American people of Sephardic-Jewish descent
American people of Scottish descent
University of California, Los Angeles alumni
Brandeis University alumni
New York University faculty
21st-century American historians
21st-century American women writers
Living people